Requiem for a Gunfighter is a 1965 American Western film, the last film directed by Spencer Gordon Bennet, produced by Alex Gordon, and starring Rod Cameron, Stephen McNally, Mike Mazurki, Dick Jones, and Olive Sturgess.

Cast

Rod Cameron as Dave McCloud
Stephen McNally as Red Zimmer
Mike Mazurki as Ivy Bliss
Olive Sturgess as Bonnie Young
Dick Jones as Cliff Fletcher
Tim McCoy as Judge Irving Short
Chet Douglas as Larry Young
Bob Steele as Max Smith
Johnny Mack Brown as Enkoff
Chris Hughes as Billy Parker

See also
List of American films of 1965

References

External links
 

1965 films
1965 Western (genre) films
American Western (genre) films
Embassy Pictures films
Films scored by Ronald Stein
1960s English-language films
Films directed by Spencer Gordon Bennet
1960s American films